The 1921 Italian Grand Prix was a Grand Prix motor race held on the Circuito della Fascia d’Oro at Montichiari, near Brescia, on 4 September 1921.

Classification

References

Italian Grand Prix
Grand Prix
Italian Grand Prix
September 1921 sports events